Grindelia subalpina, the subalpine gumweed, is a North American species of flowering plants in the Astereae tribe of the family Asteraceae.

Distribution
The plant is native to the Rocky Mountains, in Wyoming, Colorado, and New Mexico.

It grows in open rocky or gravelly sites in the Rocky Mountains.

Description
Grindelia subalpina is a biennial, or perennial herb up to 60 cm (2 feet) tall.

The plant usually produces numerous flower heads in open branching arrays. Each head has 18-27 ray flowers, surrounding a large number of tiny disc flowers.

Varieties
Grindelia subalpina var. erecta — endemic to Colorado and Wyoming.
Grindelia subalpina var. subalpina

References

External links
USDA Plants Profile for Grindelia subalpina (subalpine gumweed)
Isotype of Grindelia erecta (syn of Grindelia subalpina); Missouri Botanical Garden herbarium specimen (photo) — collected in Wyoming in 1898.

subalpina
Flora of the Rocky Mountains
Flora of Colorado
Flora of New Mexico
Flora of Wyoming
Plants described in 1898
Flora without expected TNC conservation status